Events from the year 1964 in Scotland.

Incumbents 

 Secretary of State for Scotland and Keeper of the Great Seal – Michael Noble until 16 October; then Willie Ross

Law officers 
 Lord Advocate – Ian Shearer, Lord Avonside; then Gordon Stott
 Solicitor General for Scotland – David Colville Anderson; then Henry Wilson

Judiciary 
 Lord President of the Court of Session and Lord Justice General – Lord Clyde
 Lord Justice Clerk – Lord Grant
 Chairman of the Scottish Land Court – Lord Gibson

Events 

 11 January – Nationwide UK teenage girls' magazine Jackie is first published by DC Thomson of Dundee.
 29 April – 1964 Aberdeen typhoid outbreak: All schools in Aberdeen are closed following 136 cases of typhoid being reported.
 30 April – Breakthrough on  tunnel  under the Firth of Forth to link the colliery at Valleyfield, Fife, to the modern coal processing facilities at Kinneil colliery  near Bo'ness.
 14 May – Rutherglen by-election: Labour gains seat from the Conservatives.
 20 May – 1964 Aberdeen typhoid outbreak begins.
 23 June – University of Strathclyde chartered.
 4 September – The Forth Road Bridge opens across the Firth of Forth, connecting Fife and Edinburgh.
 22 September – Hunterston A nuclear power station opens.
 15 October – United Kingdom general election: Labour defeats Sir Alec Douglas-Home's Conservatives and the Unionist Party in Scotland loses eight seats.
 20 November – The first part of the M8 motorway between Glasgow and Edinburgh is opened.
 HMNB Clyde established by the Royal Navy at Faslane on the Gare Loch.
 William Grant & Sons first market their Glenfiddich distillery Speyside single malt whisky in bottles internationally.

Births 
 2 January – Michael McCann, lawyer and politician
 29 January – Roddy Frame, singer-songwriter and guitarist 
 2 February – Susan Deacon, Labour politician and MSP (1999–2007)
 12 February – Stephen Carter, businessman and politician
 19 February – Jim McInally, international footballer and manager
 7 March – Tommy Sheridan, socialist politician and MSP (1999–2007)
 13 April – John Swinney, Scottish National Party leader and government minister
 18 April – Niall Ferguson, historian
 24 May – Liz McColgan, athlete
 31 May – Billy Davies, footballer and manager
 27 June – Shona Marshall, sport shooter
 1 August – Fiona Hyslop, Scottish National Party MSP (1999– ) and government minister
 9 September – John Hughes, footballer and manager
 4 October – Yvonne Murray, middle- and long-distance runner
 8 October – James Grant, new wave singer-songwriter
 13 November – Paul McBride, criminal lawyer (died 2012)
 11 December – Justin Currie, singer-songwriter
 25 December – Gary McAllister, international footballer, manager and coach
 Dorothy Bain, Lord Advocate
 Stephen Conroy, painter
 Aminatta Forna, novelist
 Jim Lambie, installation artist
 Alan Warner, novelist

Deaths 
 31 May – Nikolai Orlov, classical pianist (born 1892 in Russia)
 21 July – John White, international footballer (born 1937)
 25 September – Robert Wilson, tenor (born 1907)
 3 December – Dot Allan, writer (born 1886)
 11 December – Charles Donaldson, Conservative politician (born 1903)
 31 December – Ronald Fairbairn, psychoanalyst (born 1889)

The arts
 15 December – Peter Watkins' docudrama Culloden is broadcast on BBC Television.

See also 
 1964 in Northern Ireland
 1964 in Wales

References 

 
Scotland
Years of the 20th century in Scotland
1960s in Scotland